Statistics of Eastern Professional Soccer League in season 1909-10.

League standings
                           GP   W   L   T  GF  GA   Pts
 Fall River Rovers           7   4   0   3  23   8   11
 Howard & Bullough F.C.      5   3   1   1   8   9    7
 West Hudsons                5   2   2   1   5   5    5
 Philadelphia Hibernians     5   1   1   3   7   8    5
 Philadelphia Thistles       5   1   3   1   6  12    3
 Newark F.C.                 5   0   4   1   7  17    1

References

1909–10 domestic association football leagues
1909–10 in American soccer